"Facing Fearful Odds" is the twelfth episode of the fourth series of the period drama Upstairs, Downstairs. It first aired on 30 November 1974 on ITV.

Background
Facing Fearful Odds was recorded in the studio on 5 and 6 September 1974.

Cast
Gordon Jackson - Hudson
Angela Baddeley - Mrs Bridges
David Langton - Richard Bellamy
Meg Wynn Owen - Hazel Bellamy
Hannah Gordon - Virginia Hamilton
Raymond Huntley - Sir Geoffrey Dillon
Simon Williams - James Bellamy
Christopher Beeny - Edward
Jacqueline Tong - Daisy
Jenny Tomasin - Ruby
Richard Reeves - Michael Hamilton
Hilary Minster - Lt. Lightfoot, RN
Laurence Harrington - Chief Petty Officer Webb
Anthony Nash - President of the Court
Peter Whitaker - Judge Advocate

Plot
On 27 April 1918, Virginia Hamilton, a navy widow, arrives in London by train and Hazel takes her to 165, Eaton Place after finding her in her canteen. She tells Hazel and Richard how her elder son, Michael, has been arrested in Dover for cowardice. On 23 April, he was in charge of a coastal motorboat off Ostend after his commanding officer had been killed and has been accused of failing to encourage his inferior officers to fight. Sir Geoffrey Dillon suggested to represent him and Michael tells Sir Geoffrey how he just couldn't move at the time. He tells Michael not to admit his feeling to guilt to the hearing, which will be held in Dover.

At the hearing, Sir Geoffrey sums up by saying that when Michael originally spoke to his superior after the attack, he blamed himself so the Chief Petty Officer could get the recognition he deserved. While the Court finds Michael guilty, Michael is only reprimanded due to the circumstances of the incident. However days later, Michael is killed in action in Ostend having acted bravely. Richard feels guilty as he has pulled strings, at Michael's request, to give a chance to prove himself, but Virginia reassures him her late husband would have done the same. Richard is equally impressed by her bravery

Meanwhile, James is feeling depressed and neglected and Rose is on holiday at Southwold. Edward goes AWOL the day before he is due to go back to France. The Royal Military Police arrive at 165, and after Hudson tells Daisy that the punishment for going AWOL is the firing squad, she tells them that Edward is hiding in his father's bombed out house in Walthamstow. He is then sent to France.

References

Richard Marson, "Inside UpDown - The Story of Upstairs, Downstairs", Kaleidoscope Publishing, 2005 
Updown.org.uk - Upstairs, Downstairs Fansite

Upstairs, Downstairs (series 4) episodes
1974 British television episodes
Fiction set in 1918